Venous stasis, or venostasis,  is a condition of slow blood flow in the veins, usually of the legs.

Presentation

Complications
Potential complications of venous stasis are:
 Venous ulcers
 Blood clot formation in veins (venous thrombosis), that can occur in the deep veins of the legs (deep vein thrombosis, DVT) or in the superficial veins

Causes
Causes of venous stasis include:
 Obesity
 Pregnancy 
 Previous damage to leg
 Blood clot
 Smoking
 Swelling and inflammation of a vein close to the skin
 Congestive heart failure.
 Long periods of immobility that can be encountered from driving, flying, bed rest/hospitalization, or having an orthopedic cast. Recommendations by clinicians to reduce venous stasis and DVT/PE often encourage increasing walking, calf exercises, and intermittent pneumatic compression when possible.

Diagnosis

See also
 Virchow's triad

References

Diseases of veins, lymphatic vessels and lymph nodes
Vascular surgery
Preventive medicine